Wang Ao is the name of:

Wang Ao (Viceroy) (1384–1467), Ming dynasty politician
Wang Ao (Grand Secretary) (1450–1524), Ming dynasty Grand Secretary and essayist
Wang Ao (Qing dynasty) ( 18th century), Qing dynasty official